Thr!!!er (stylized as THR!!!ER, pronounced Thriller) is the fifth studio album by American rock band !!!. It was released in 2013 through Warp.

The title is a reference to Michael Jackson's album Thriller, which guitarist Mario Andreoni described as "synonymous with an artist(s)' and/or genre(s)' artistic high-watermark."

Track listing

Personnel
 Rafael Cohen – vocals, guitars, keyboards
 Nic Offer – vocals, keyboards
 Mario Andreoni – guitar, keyboards
 Allan Wilson – saxophone, keyboards, percussion, background vocals
 Daniel Gorman – keyboards, background vocals
 Paul Quattrone – drums
 Chase Jarvis – photography

Charts

References

2010 albums
!!! albums
Warp (record label) albums